The heats for the men's 1500 m freestyle race at the 2009 World Championships took place on the morning of 1 August, with the final in the evening session of 2 August at the Foro Italico in Rome, Italy.

Records
Prior to the competition, the existing world and championship record were as follows:

Results

Heats

Final

External links
Heats Results
Final Results

Freestyle Men 1500